Blow Buddies was the largest gay sex club in San Francisco, California. Its building was constructed in 1953. It is zoned Service/Arts/Light Industrial (SALI) with a 30 ft height limit, so neither housing nor a hotel can be built here, but affordable housing may be constructed.

History
The club opened in 1988 and is 6,000 square feet. In 1993 the building was bought by its current owners for $US 500,000 In 2019 its building went on the market at $US 3.25 million, potentially jeopardizing the club's existence.

The following announcement was posted on the Blow Buddies website on July 19, 2020:

Sadly, Blow Buddies will not be reopening after the pandemic.
We tried many ways to figure out a path to return and were unsuccessful.
We appreciate the willingness of the LEATHER & LGBTQ Cultural district and
our landlord to explore options with us.
It was a good run,
August 8, 1988 - March 15, 2020
We are sad to see this chapter close.
We thank our many members for their support over all those years.
The club was created in response to one virus and done in by another.

References

External links
 official website

LGBT culture in San Francisco
Entertainment venues in San Francisco